Knyvett v Christchurch Casinos Ltd [1999] 2 NZLR 559 is a cited case in New Zealand regarding whether a contract illegal under statute, can be subsequently validated under the Illegal Contracts Act 1970.

Background
Polglase won a $31,173.71 jackpot at the Christchurch Casino, however when the casino later discovered that he was only 18 years old, a minor, they refused to pay him out his winnings.

The Casino argued that under the Casino Control Act 1990, gambling by a minor is illegal, and thus honouring any wager would be illegal under the Act.

However, the Act only prohibited a minor being on the premises of a Casino, it did not go as far as stating any bets would be illegal as well.

The casino successfully obtained a judgment from the High Court.

Polglase, via his guardian Kynvett appealed.

Decision
The court refused to grant relief.

References

New Zealand contract case law
1999 in New Zealand law
1999 in case law
Court of Appeal of New Zealand cases